Yang Bo may refer to:

Yang Bo (door god), venerated as a door deity with Xu Yanzhao
Yang Bo (gymnast) (born 1973), Chinese female gymnast
Yang Bo (boxer) (born 1983), Chinese boxer
Yang Bo (archer) (born 1978), Chinese archer
Yang Bo (politician), former minister of light industry of China

See also
Bo Yang (disambiguation)